Robertsville may refer to:
Places in the United States
Robertsville, Connecticut
Robertsville, Missouri
Robertsville, New Jersey
Robertsville, Ohio
Robertsville, Tennessee
Robertsville State Park, a state park in Missouri

Places in Canada
Robertsville, Ontario
Robertsville, Frontenac County, Ontario